Sir Paul Rycaut FRS (23 December 1629 – 16 November 1700) was an English diplomat and historian, and an authority on the Ottoman Empire.

Life
Rycaut's Huguenot father was held in the Tower of London, during the English Civil War, for his Cavalier sympathy, but the sequestration of his property was lifted.

Rycaut was born in Aylesford, Kent, and graduated from Trinity College, Cambridge, in 1650. In 1652, he was admitted to Gray's Inn. While studying at Alcalá de Henares, he learned Spanish and translated the first part of Baltasar Gracián's The Critick. Rycaut was then employed as private secretary to Heneage Finch, 3rd Earl of Winchilsea, ambassador to the Ottoman Empire. He became British Consul and factor at Smyrna (now İzmir). From 1689 to 1700, he was Resident at Hamburg.

On 12 December 1666, Rycaut was elected a Fellow of the Royal Society.

Knighthood was conferred on him in 1685. He died in Hamburg, aged 70, of a stroke.

Works

 
 1670 French translation and Images from the book at National Library of France BnF Gallica
 The Present State of the Greek and Armenian Churches, Anno Christi 1678 Written at the Command of His Majesty by Paul Ricaut, Printed for John Starkey, 1679
 
 
 
 Baptista Platina, The lives of the popes, Translator Paul Rycaut, Illustrator Robert White, printed for C. Wilkinson, 1688
 

His letters to William Blathwayt are held at Princeton University.

References

External links

 
 "Paul Rycaut", The Royal Society
 "Ottoman Politics Through British Eyes: Paul Rycaut's the Present State of the Ottoman Empire", Journal of World History, Linda T. Darling, Vol. 5, 1994
 "Sir Paul Rycaut's Memoranda and Letters from Ireland 1686-1687", Analecta Hibernica, Patrick Melvin and Paul Rycaut, No. 27 (1972), pp. 123, 125-199 

1629 births
1700 deaths
People from Aylesford
British diplomats
British orientalists
Alumni of Trinity College, Cambridge
Fellows of the Royal Society
Chief Secretaries for Ireland
Knights Bachelor
Irish admiralty judges